The Church and Convent of Saint Antony is a 17th-century Roman Catholic church located in Igarassu, Pernambuco, Brazil. It was constructed by the Jesuits during the settlement of Pernambuco and destroyed during the Dutch occupation of Brazil and is dedicated to is dedicated to Saint Anthony. The church was rebuilt late in the 16th century and sits adjacent to the Church of Saints Cosme and Damião, the oldest functioning church in Brazil. It was designated a historic structure by National Institute of Historic and Artistic Heritage (IPHAN) in 1950.

History

Construction of the Church and Convent of Saint Antony began during the early period of Jesuit activity in Pernambuco in the mid-16th century. Igarassu became the second-most important city in Pernambuco before the Dutch occupation of Brazil. The church and convent were completely destroyed during the Dutch occupation. Reconstruction of the church and convent began in 1654 and concluded in 1693. The Church and Convent of Saint Antony no longer conducts religious services; it was converted into a sacred art museum. The church and convent are located in the Historic Center of Igarassu.

Structure

The Church and Convent of Saint Antony is built in the Baroque style common to the period. The façade dates to 1660 and was subsequently renovated. It has three arches at its first level with a single door into the nave. Three rectangular windows are at the choir level above the entrance with red shutters. A renovation in the mid-18th century resulted in the addition of richly designed interior design elements: engraved tiles, painted and carved furniture, a painted ceiling, a new sacristy, and curved wall segments, and architectural feature rare to the Northeast region of Brazil. The church also has a large washbasin made of stone imported from Portugal.

The church now function as a museum of sacred art, commonly known as the Igarassu History Museum.

Protected status

The Church and Convent of Saint Antony was listed as a historic structure by the National Institute of Historic and Artistic Heritage in 1939. It is listed in the Book of Historical Works process no. 131.

See also

 Church of São Cosme e São Damião
 Chapel of Our Lady of Deliverance

References

Roman Catholic churches in Pernambuco
17th-century Roman Catholic church buildings in Brazil
Roman Catholic churches completed in 1693
Portuguese colonial architecture in Brazil
National heritage sites of Pernambuco